Bajung  is a village development committee in Parbat District in the Dhawalagiri Zone of Western Development Region, Nepal. It is surrounded by Deupurkot to the north-east, Tilahar to the south-east, Durlung to the south-west and Kyang to the north-west. It is popularly said to be extended from the top of Maidan, a hill-top with historical identity to the basin of Modi River. At the time of the 2011 Nepal census it had a population of 4228 people living in 1,076 individual households.

Like all VDCs of Nepal, it comprises nine wards:
 Ward 1: Patichaur (पातीचौर),
 Ward 2: Bause (बाऊसे),
 Ward 3: Sanopakha (सानोपाखा),
 Ward 4: Shivalaya (शिवालय),
 Ward 5: Bhaththar (भत्थर),
 Ward 6: Bardeghar (बर्देघर),
 Ward 7: Falhalne (फलहाल्ने),
 Ward 8: Laampaat (लाम्पट),
 Ward 9: Kalimati (कालीमाटी)

References

External links
UN map of the municipalities of Parbat District
Government of Nepal National Planning Commission Secretariat Central Bureau of Statistics

Populated places in Parbat District